The Serie B 1979–80 was the forty-eighth tournament of this competition played in Italy since its creation.

Teams
Como, Parma, Matera and Pisa had been promoted from Serie C, while Vicenza, Hellas Verona and Atalanta had been relegated from Serie A.

Final classification

Results

References and sources
Almanacco Illustrato del Calcio - La Storia 1898-2004, Panini Edizioni, Modena, September 2005

Serie B seasons
2
Italy